Nanthakarn Yordphaisong (born 23 September 1993) is a Thai badminton player. He was the men's doubles runner-up at the 2017 China and Vietnam International Challenge tournament partnered with Trawut Potieng. Yordphaisong also a part of the Thailand national team to win bronze at the 2017 Sudirman Cup.

Achievements

BWF International Challenge/Series (4 titles, 7 runners-up) 
Men's doubles

  BWF International Challenge tournament
  BWF International Series tournament

References

External links 
 

1993 births
Living people
Nanthakarn Yordphaisong
Competitors at the 2017 Southeast Asian Games
Competitors at the 2021 Southeast Asian Games
Nanthakarn Yordphaisong
Nanthakarn Yordphaisong
Southeast Asian Games medalists in badminton
Nanthakarn Yordphaisong